Egyptian Empire Records is the oldest electro record label owned by Egyptian Lover. Known for its unique style of electro music, it also has a political background because Egyptian Lover was the first Afroamerican Label Owner.

Background
It was founded in 1983 by Egyptian Lover as Freak Beat Records. Since then, it has served us with uptempo Electro Beats pressed on Wax. During its first few years, it was home of Uncle Jamm's Army. In 1985, it changed its name to Egyptian Empire Records. Several releases made to the Billboard Charts and it was the Home of Rodney O and Joe Cooley.

Notable Artists
Egyptian Lover
Rodney O and Joe Cooley
Uncle Jamm's Army
The Lover II
2 O'Clock
His Majesti

References

External links
Egyptian Empire Records Discography

American record labels
Record labels established in 1983
1983 establishments in the United States